Ross Smith (born November 20, 1953) is a Canadian former professional ice hockey player who played in the World Hockey Association (WHA). Smith played part of the 1974–75 WHA season with the Indianapolis Racers. He played the role of Barclay Donaldson in the 1977 comedy film Slap Shot.

Career statistics

References

External links

1953 births
Living people
Calgary Centennials players
Canadian ice hockey right wingers
Chilliwack Bruins (BCHL) players
Columbus Owls players
Ice hockey people from Alberta
Indianapolis Racers players
Mohawk Valley Comets (NAHL) players
Victoria Cougars (WHL) players